Warriors 4 Christ Wrestling (W4CW) is an independent professional wrestling promotion based in San Antonio, Texas. W4CW is a non-profit organization operated by Warriors 4 Christ INC.

History

The company's founder and President, Curtis Stone A.K.A. "Nightmare", Cheyene, George Carey, The Rolling Stone (Part of the Tag-Team Rolling Stones),Mark McFadden, formerly competed as a professional wrestler and has operated the organization since 1999. Stone previously worked as an enforcer for drug dealers, collecting money from debtors, before he became a Christian. The promotion was originally called Southern Heat Championship Wrestling. The name was considered too suggestive by some churches, however, so the organization was renamed in late summer of 2006. W4CW promotes wrestling events at schools and churches, and proceeds are donated to local charities, such as orphanages, woman's shelters, and churches. W4CW events also features Christian musical acts, and some include sermons. Although W4CW includes a religious aspect, matches are conducted the same way as in other promotions. Foreign objects, such as chairs, are used as weapons during matches. All wrestlers are trained, and many are pursuing long-term careers in professional wrestling. Because of the nature of a Christian wrestling promotion, however, W4CW has met with resistance from some fans and churches, both of whom are suspicious of an organization that combines professional wrestling with religion.  	

W4CW's headquarters is in San Antonio and operates over 40 shows each year, which take place both in the United States and Mexico. Many of the shows are free, and events are usually attended by several hundred people. It was named Promotion of the Year in 2008 by the San Antonio Independent Wrestling Scene. The promotion's top championship is the W4CW Heavyweight Championship, which is currently held by The Great Ryu, and Intercontinental Champion Tony Vega and Middle Weight Champion is Weazy Woo, Tag Team Champions are "Double Trouble" (Chris James and Tony Vega).

Champions

Roster

Male wrestlers
Dusty Wolfe
Doink The Clown
Curtis Stone aka Nightmare
Tommy Gunn
Tony Vega
Chris James
Prince Al Farat
Big Time Tommy
Weazy Woo
Rocky Morocco
The Great Ryu
Dragon X
Wild Man Jack
Johnny Ruckus
Mighty B
The Crucifix
Krazy Klown
El Gusanito
Black and White
Mizkeen
Mechanico Loco

Other on-screen personnel
Filthy Rich - Manager and Trainer
The Fire Up Kid (Ralphy) "Manager"
Lucious - Manager
Bishop Brown - "Ring Announcer"
Ray The Voice - Ring Announcer
Alex / Rin Tin Tin / Alfred - Referee

References

Independent professional wrestling promotions based in Texas